Mohamed Marwan (in Arabic محمد مروان) better known as just Marwan (born 1980) is a Danish-Palestinian rapper. Formerly known as SLP (Statsløs Palæstinenser, literally Stateless Palestinian), he also belongs to the Aarhus crew Pimp-A-Lot.

As a 10-year-old, Marwan came to Denmark from Saudi Arabia, he grew up in Aarhus. He has been writing rap songs since 2000 and starred, among other things, Pimp-A-Lot releases "Uden om systemet" in 2001 and "I er selv uden om det" in 2003.

Marwan released his debut album P.E.R.K.E.R. on the Danish indie record label Tabu Records. The album was produced by Tabu Records Lounge Lizzard and Marwan's main producer, Abu Malek. He followed it up in 2011 with the album Mennesker on the same label.

He is in Full Impact Productions (F.I.P.) or Full Impact Productions Gangsta Clique (F.I.P.G.C.).

After three years of silence since the album "Marwan", Marwan released the single "Århus V Veteran" with L.O.C. on 17 February 2017.

Marwan started together with Michel Svane (Drums/producer) and Søren Bendz (Guitar), the band SortHandsk in 2019. They released the album "SortHandsk" on 17/09/2021.

The album was recorded, mixed and mastered by Tue Madsen at Antfarm Studios.

The critically acclaimed album led to live concerts at Spot Festival, Copenhell and SmukFest.

Discography

Albums

References

External links
Marwan Official website
Marwan Pimp-A-Lot MySpace site

1980 births
Living people
Danish hip hop musicians
Danish rappers